Jean Gilbert (1 December 1919 – 2002) was a female English diver who competed for Great Britain in the 1936 Summer Olympics. She was born in Sheffield. In 1936 she finished seventh in the 10 metre platform event. At the 1938 British Empire Games she represented England and finished fourth in the high diving competition.

References

1919 births
2002 deaths
Sportspeople from Sheffield
English female divers
Olympic divers of Great Britain
Divers at the 1936 Summer Olympics
Commonwealth Games competitors for England
Divers at the 1938 British Empire Games